The Nightmare of Black Island is a BBC Books original novel written by Mike Tucker and based on the long-running science fiction television series Doctor Who. It was published on 21 September 2006, alongside The Art of Destruction and The Price of Paradise. It features the Tenth Doctor and Rose.

Synopsis
On a lonely stretch of Welsh coastline, a fisherman is killed by a hideous creature from beneath the waves. When the Doctor and Rose arrive, they discover a village where the children are plagued by nightmares, and the nights are ruled by monsters. Bronwyn Ceredig, the old woman of the village, suspects that ailing industrialist Nathaniel Morton is to blame, but the Doctor has suspicions of his own.

Plot
While in flight, the TARDIS and Rose dream of a fisherman who is attacked by a creature from the sea. Also appearing in the dream is an 'observer': a young boy. Tracing the source, the Doctor takes them to Ynys Du, a small village on the Welsh coast. They discover that the villagers are terrorised by fantastical monsters which roam the streets and woods at night; the adults are anxious and the children all have nightmares.

The trouble seems to have begun when an elderly Nathaniel Morton returned to the village after many years away and established a 'nursing home' in the old rectory. Here, six ancient figures sleep, attached to machines and attended by masked technicians.

The Doctor knows something is wrong, as the monsters do not appear to be the product of a normal evolutionary process. He traces an interference signal to the abandoned lighthouse on Black Island. Exploring the island with an eccentric local woman, Bronwyn, the Doctor finds an 'interstellar space-hopper' and, in the lamp room of the lighthouse, a psychic transmitter/receiver. Understanding that this is causing the children's nightmares, in turn realising the monsters they dream about, the Doctor is reluctant to dismantle the machine and risk damaging the children. He cannot reach the controls of the telepathic circuits as they are underneath the machine.

Meanwhile, Rose has entered the rectory in search of further information. She is discovered by the 'medical technicians' who reveal themselves to be the lizard-like Cynrog who, under their chief priest Peyne, are manipulating Morton. Rose is subjected to a mind-scan. The Doctor is alerted to Rose's capture when a Slitheen and a Nestene Consciousness are created and a Dalek is heard nearby.

Having instructed the villagers to keep the children awake (to prevent the appearance of more monsters), the Doctor rushes to rescue her; however, she has already escaped with the help of one of the village girls, Ali. She tells the Doctor of a strange monster she has seen in the rectory library.

The Doctor sends Rose (with the sonic screwdriver) and Ali to Bronwyn, so she might take them to the lighthouse, in the expectation that the smaller Ali can reach under the alien machinery to alter the settings so it no longer affects the children.

The Doctor takes Rose's place in the rectory. Following Rose's brain-scan, Peyne and Morton know he is a Time Lord, and are excited by what they might gain from him. They show him the monster in the library. The Doctor deduces that the body is empty, created from the nightmares of the children. Peyne admits that the body is to receive the soul of Balor, their warrior general who had crashed on Earth eighty years earlier. His original body dying, he transferred his soul into the child witnesses of the crash: Morton and the other 'people' attached to the machines.

Moving into the final phase, Peyne orders her Cynrog technicians to attach both the Doctor and Morton to waiting machines, and alters them to induce sleep in the wakeful children so she might continue to harness their imaginations.

The Doctor uses the telepathic machines (which operate at the same frequency as the TARDIS's) to take control.  He investigates the memory of the other victims and, through the vision of the small boy - who has appeared at intervals throughout the story - discovers that Bronwyn also witnessed the crash, and contains some of Balor's soul.  'Hitching a ride' on the telepathic waves, the Doctor contacts Rose, instructing her how to alter the machinery to affect adults rather than children.

The newly created Balor, missing a part of his soul, is mad and ungovernable, wreaking havoc throughout the house.  Peyne frees the Doctor, blaming him.  'Balor' takes Morton's mind and revenges himself on Peyne.  Before 'Morton-Balor' can attack the Doctor, Ali and Rose succeed in changing the settings on the alien transmitter.  The village children wake and the adults dream, starving Balor of imagination and shrinking him until the neuroses of the adults become so trivial he ceases to exist.

Before the alien machines in the rectory are destroyed by the resulting fire, the 'polarity is reversed' and, connecting to Bronwyn, it transfers all the life-force into her.  She becomes young again.

The Doctor orders the remaining Cynrog to leave in their spaceship, sending them  '40 or 50 parsecs' out of their way, and hinting to Rose that their stasis will be tormented by nightmares of him.

Continuity
 When asked by Rose if he ever slept, the Doctor said he didn't (although he'd tried it once). This seems a contradiction of accepted canon, as he has been seen sleeping on occasion (an example is Castrovalva, and he also mentions that his regeneration will be fine after a few hours' sleep in The Twin Dilemma). He also mentions not sleeping in The Last Dodo.
 At one point, the Doctor uses the computer-enhanced opera glasses seen in "The Empty Child".
 The Doctor reminds Rose of New Earth when she complains that he never takes her anywhere "nice and warm". Rose then points out that she spent part of that visit being possessed by Lady Cassandra.
 The Doctor uses everlasting matches in the forest, introduced in the William Hartnell story, The Daleks.
 When she meets the Cynrog for the first time, Rose mentions the Slitheen. The Cynrog appear to know them, as they correctly identify them as Raxacoricofallapatorians.

Audio book
An abridged audio book version of The Nightmare of Black Island read by Anthony Head (Mr Finch from "School Reunion") was released in November 2006 by BBC Audiobooks. Also included was a "behind-the-scenes" discussion between the author and the reader.

See also

Whoniverse

External links

The Cloister Library – The Nightmare of Black Island

2006 British novels
2006 science fiction novels
British science fiction novels
Tenth Doctor novels
Novels by Mike Tucker
Novels set in Wales
Novels set on islands